Labelle is the debut album of American singing trio Labelle, formerly a four-girl group known as Patti LaBelle & The Bluebelles. This was Labelle's first release for Warner Bros. Records.

Track listing 
Side A
 "Morning Much Better" (Aram Schefrin, Michael Zager) (4:00)
 "You've Got a Friend" (Carole King) (4:16)
 "Baby's Out of Sight" (Sarah Dash, Armstead Edwards) (2:35)
 "Time & Love" (Laura Nyro) (3:45)
 "Too Many Days" (Nona Hendryx) (2:57)
Side B
 "Running Out of Fools/If You Gotta Make a Fool of Somebody" (Kay Rogers, Richard Ahlert/Rudy Clark) (4:15)
 "Shades of Difference" (Nona Hendryx, Patti LaBelle) (3:14)
 "Heart Be Still" (Bert Berns, Jerry Ragavoy) (3:14)
 "Wild Horses" (Mick Jagger, Keith Richards) (3:03)
 "Time" (Patti LaBelle, Armstead Edwards) (3:48)
 "When the Sun Comes Shining Through (The Ladder)" (Michael D'Abo) (3:56)

Personnel
Labelle
Patti LaBelle - vocals
Nona Hendryx - vocals
Sarah Dash - vocals
with:
Buzzy Linhart - rhythm guitar
Kenny Ascher - piano
Gene Casey - piano, musical director
Judy Clay, The Sweet Inspirations - backing vocals
Gene Cornish - guitar
Marlo Henderson - rhythm guitar
Andre Lewis, John Taylor - organ, clavinet
Bob Mann - guitar
Don Payne, Bill Takas - bass guitar
Luther Rix, Dave Williams, Jimmy Johnson - drums
Aram Schefrin - rhythm guitar
David Spinozza - guitar
Ted Castleman - percussion
Al Kooper - organ on "Time"
Technical
Jack Adams - engineer
Jack Douglas - assistant engineer
Bob Gruen - cover photo

References

External links 
 
 Labelle on Discogs.com

1971 debut albums
Labelle albums
Warner Records albums
Albums produced by Kit Lambert
Albums produced by Vicki Wickham